Futbol Club Barcelona Atlètic, commonly referred to as Barça Atlètic or Barça B, is a football team based in Barcelona, Catalonia, Spain, that competes in Primera Federación – Group 2, the third tier of the Spanish league system. Founded in 1970, it is the reserve team of FC Barcelona and it plays its home fixtures at Johan Cruyff Stadium.

Reserve teams in Spain play in the same league system as the senior team, rather than in a reserve team league. They must play at least one level below their main side and they are not eligible to play in the Copa del Rey.

History

Espanya Industrial 

Founded on 1 August 1934 as Societat Esportiva Industrial Espanya, the club was originally the sports team of the factory with the same name, and its shirt featured blue and white vertical stripes. The company was owned by the family of Josep Antoni de Albert, who was briefly president of FC Barcelona in 1943; during Albert's presidency the club, now known as Club Deportivo Espanya Industrial, became Barcelona's reserve team and began to play home games at Camp de Les Corts.

Initially, Industrial played in the local regional leagues but, in 1950, it was promoted to Tercera División, reaching Segunda División two years later. In 1953 the club finished as runners-up in both the league and the promotion play-off but, being a nursery club of Barcelona, it was unable to move up a division.

CD Condal 

After winning another promotion play-off in 1956, Espanya Industrial became independent of FC Barcelona and was renamed Club Deportivo Condal. The club wore blue shirts with two white diagonals stripes.

Condal competed once in La Liga, in the 1956–57 season, being relegated as 16th and last. In 1968 the club rejoined the Barcelona family as its reserve team, and adopted the blaugrana colours.

Barcelona Atlètic/Barcelona B 

In 1970, Barcelona president Agustí Montal decided to merge Condal with another junior club, Atlètic Catalunya, and formed Barcelona Atlètic. Atlètic was founded in 1965 as a result of the merger of two other teams: UE Catalunya de Les Corts (founded in 1918 as Catalunya Sporting Club) and CD Fabra Coats (1926).

Under the new denomination the B-team played a total of ten seasons in the second level. At the end of 1988–89 the side returned to Segunda División B – the new third level created in 1977 – after ranking 17th.

In 1990 the team was renamed Barcelona B, but club president Joan Laporta changed the name back to Barcelona Atlètic in 2008. Two years later, his successor Sandro Rosell returned to the previous denomination, until Laporta changed again the name back to Barcelona Atlètic during his second presidential term in 2022.

Former club player Luis Enrique (who also played for Real Madrid) succeeded Pep Guardiola as team manager in the summer of 2008, as the latter was appointed main squad coach. In 2009–10 the club finished second in Group III and returned to division two after an absence of 11 years; this was followed by a third-place in the following campaign, but the team was not eligible for promotion.

Season to season 

23 seasons in Segunda División
2 seasons in Primera Federación
23 seasons in Segunda División B
4 seasons in Tercera División
1 season in Categorías Regionales

Honours 
Segunda División B
Winners (10): 1981–82, 1990–91, 1997–98, 2001–02, 2016–17 
Tercera División
Winners (20): 1973–74, 2007–08

Players

Current squad

From Youth Academy

Other players under contract

Out on loan

Personnel

Current technical staff

Former coaches

Records 
Players in bold are still active with club.

Most appearances 

All competitions

League matches (2ª and 2ª B)

Top scorers 

All competitions

League matches (2ª and 2ª B)

Stadium 

On 23 September 1982 the Mini Estadi was inaugurated by Barcelona president Josep Lluís Núñez. Next to the ground there are two training pitches, pitch 3 and 4, which have artificial turf – the latter has a regulation size of 100 x 70 metres and has seating for 1,000 spectators.

Mini Estadi has also hosted games for the Andorra national football team, and the Barcelona Dragons of American football.

As a part of the Espai Barça project, the Mini Estadi was demolished and the Estadi Johan Cruyff was opened to take its place starting in the 2019–20 season. Also, as part of this project the Camp Nou will undergo renovation.

La Masia 

Inaugurated on 26 September 1966, La Masia is the name given to Barcelona's training facilities located near the Camp Nou in the Les Corts district of Barcelona. It is an ancient country residence built in 1702 and once Camp Nou was inaugurated in 1957, the building was remodelled and extended for use as the club's social headquarters.

In 1979, La Masia became the residence of young players from outside of the city. In the following decades the academy forged several players that would later appear for both the main squad and the Spain national team, Guillermo Amor, Albert Ferrer, Iván de la Peña, Josep Guardiola, Carles Puyol, Gerard López, Xavi, Víctor Valdés, and Andrés Iniesta being amongst the most prominent. Lionel Messi is also an alumnus of La Masia and is one of the most famous players to play for Barcelona as well as the Argentina national football team.

Notable players

Note: This list includes players that have appeared in at least 100 top league games and/or have reached international status.

   Iván Balliu
  Rey Manaj
  Marc Bernaus
  Lionel Messi
  Srđan Pecelj
   Rafinha Alcântara
  Macky Bagnack
  Fabrice Ondoa
  Patrick Suffo
  Ballou Tabla
  Merveil Ndockyt
  Alen Halilović
  Goran Vučević
  Diego Almeida
  Ilaix Moriba
  Anthony Lozano
  Ottó Vincze
  Gai Assulin
  Thiago Motta
  Hiroki Abe
  Giovani dos Santos
  Jonathan dos Santos
  Lazar Carević
   Munir El Haddadi
  Moha El Yaagoubi
  Abde Ezzalzouli
  Jordi Cruyff
  Haruna Babangida
  David Babunski
  Antonio Sanabria
  Igor Korneev
  Steve Archibald
  Diawandou Diagne
  Moussa Wagué
  Goran Drulić
  Alfi Conteh-Lacalle
  Lee Seung-woo
  Paik Seung-ho
  Damià Abella
  José Joaquín Albaladejo
  Luis Alberto
  Albert Albesa
  Thiago Alcântara
  Carles Aleñá
  Quique Álvarez
  Guillermo Amor
  Francesc Arnau
  Óscar Arpón
  Mikel Arteta
  Alejandro Balde
  Sergi Barjuán
  Marc Bartra
  Alberto Botía
  Sergio Busquets
  Ramón Calderé
  "Lobo" Carrasco
  Lluís Carreras
  Albert Celades
  Luis Cembranos
  Thomas Christiansen
  Paco Clos
  Miquel Corominas
  Marc Cucurella
  Iván de la Peña
  Gerard Deulofeu
  Martín Domínguez
  Juan José Estella
  Ansu Fati
  Kiko Femenía
  Albert Ferrer
  Chico Flores
  Andreu Fontàs
  Paco Fortes
  Esteve Fradera
  Sergio García
  Gabri García
  Óscar García
  Roger García
  Luis García
  Salva García
  Gavi
  Delfí Geli
  José Gil
  Jordi Gómez
  Sergi Gómez
  Álex Grimaldo
  Pep Guardiola
  Dani Güiza
  Xavi Hernández
  Sebastián Herrera
  Alejo Indias
  Andrés Iniesta
  Juan Luis Irazusta
  Bojan Krkić
  Gerard López
  David Lombán
  Miguel Ángel Lozano
  Manolo
  Quique Martín
  Nacho Martín
  Rubén Martínez
  Paco Martínez
  Josep Martínez
  Luis Milla
  Mingo
  Óscar Mingueza
  Juan Miranda
  Martín Montoya
  Josep Moratalla
  Pepe Moré
  Javi Moreno
  Carlos Muñoz
  Fernando Navarro
  Nayim
  Nolito
  Antonio Olmo
  Cristóbal Parralo
  Patric
  Ángel Pedraza
  Antonio Pinilla
  Oleguer Presas
  Carles Puyol
  Sandro Ramírez
  Pepe Reina
  Oriol Riera
  Sergi Roberto
  Rubén Rochina
  Pedro
  Juan Carlos Rojo
  Oriol Romeu
  Mikel Roteta
  Francisco Rufete
  Abel Ruiz
  Tente Sánchez
  Onésimo Sánchez
  Víctor Sánchez
  Pepe Serer
  Adjutori Serrat
  Denis Suárez
  Cristian Tello
  Xavi Torres
  Adama Traoré
  Roberto Trashorras
  Víctor Valdés
  Toni Velamazán
  Joan Verdú
  Paqui Veza
  Javier Villena
  Jordi Vinyals
  Konrad de la Fuente
  Ronald Araújo
  Jeffrén Suárez

References

External links 

 
 Futbolme team profile 
 BDFutbol team profile

 
B
Spanish reserve football teams
Football clubs in Barcelona
Association football clubs established in 1970
1970 establishments in Spain
Segunda División clubs
Primera Federación clubs